Barilius ornatus is a fish in genus Barilius of the family Cyprinidae.

References

Fish of Thailand
ornatus
Fish described in 1883